Duckwater Valley is a valley in Nye County, Nevada. The Duckwater Valley is enclosed by the Pancake Range in the west and by the Duckwater Hills in the east. The Duckwater Creek crosses the valley. State Route 379 goes partially through the Duckwater Valley as well. The only populated place in the valley is Duckwater. Part of the valley is occupied by the Duckwater Reservation.

History 
The valley had been inhabited for a long time by Native Americans, when the first white Americans settled in the Duckwater Valley in the 1860s after silver ore was discovered in nearby Hamilton. Agriculture arose in the valley, and for years hay, grain, vegetables, and fruit were grown for the inhabitants of Hamilton. Isaak "Ike" Irwin, who produced hay, was in 1868 the first person to settle in the present-day village Duckwater. When Hamilton was in decline, farmers in the Duckwater Valley started focussing on hay and grain, that they fed to their cattle. That land was used for growing grain and vegetables. Back then, some fruit plants had been planted recently.

Thereafter, the livestock sector gradually grew in the Duckwater Valley, and it became the biggest in the valley. Around 1910, the farmers reduced the size of their cattle, because their rangelands were damaged by flocks of wild sheep in the winter season. In 1913, the Ely Record said the Duckwater Valley was "one of the most extensive ranching and farming sections in Eastern Nevada." Those ranches grew hay, grain, alfalfa, and potatoes, and were grazed by herds of cattle.

The idea to establish a reservation had first been raised in 1937 by employees of the Florio Ranch, of which the owner wasn't able to pay the mortgage after he lost all his sheep in a blizzard. They figured they could sell the ranch together with some other ranches to the government for an Indian reservation. After the idea received the support of the Shoshone, the Bureau of Indian Affairs bought two ranches, and thus created the Indian reservation.

References 

Valleys of Nye County, Nevada
Valleys of Nevada